The Director of the Victoria and Albert Museum is the head of the Victoria and Albert Museum in London, a post currently held by Tristram Hunt, who succeeded Martin Roth, who died in August 2017, months after he announced he would resign in January. He is responsible for that institution's general administration and reports its accounts to the British Government. The actual governance of the Museum, however, is delegated to its board of trustees; these are appointed individually by the British Prime Minister.

References

Victoria and Albert Museum, Director